Morris Abraham Schapiro (1903 – December 26, 1996) was an American investment banker and chess master; in the 1950s, he negotiated the mergers of Chase Bank and the Bank of Manhattan and of Chemical Bank and New York Trust Company.  
His brother was art historian Meyer Schapiro.

Life

Background
Morris Abraham Schapiro was born in the Russian Empire in 1903 and came to the United States in 1907. The family lived in Brownsville and Flatbush, Brooklyn.  His father worked as a paper and cordage wholesaler, though he also wrote articles on philosophical subjects.  His brother was art historian Meyer Schapiro.

He excelled in mathematics and Latin at school.

At 16, he entered Columbia University on a Pulitzer Scholarship and graduated from Columbia College in 1923. He received an advanced degree from Columbia University in engineering in 1925.

Chess

Schapiro excelled also in chess.  He led the Columbia University chess team to four national championships.  In New York, he took 3rd, behind Dawid Janowski and Roy Turnbull Black, in 1920, twice won Manhattan CC championship in 1921 and 1922, and took 9th in 1923 (Oscar Chajes won). Schapiro won a match against Chajes (7.5 : 5.5) in 1923. He took 5th at Lake Hopatcong 1923 (American Chess Congress, Frank James Marshall won), tied for 4-5th at New York 1924 (José Raúl Capablanca won), and took 2nd, behind Abraham Kupchik, at New York 1924.

Career

Schapiro served as head of his own investment banking firm, M. A. Schapiro & Company.  He established new business techniques for the banking industry.  He also led some of the banking industry's largest mergers:  Chase Bank and the Bank of Manhattan in 1955, then Chemical Bank and New York Trust in 1959.  "On both deals, Mr. Schapiro followed his traditional strategy. He recommended the two banks' stocks to affluent clients, then asked them to press the banks' managements to agree to a deal," the New York Times wrote in his obituary.

Philanthropy
Schapiro was a major donor to Columbia University, including Schapiro Hall (dormitory) and the Morris A. Schapiro Center for Engineering and Physical Science Research.

Personal life and death
Schapiro married Alma Binion Cahn, a painter, who died in 1987, after 58 years of marriage. They had two children, Linda Schapiro Collins and Dr. Daniel Schapiro.  His grandchildren include painter Jacob Collins.

Schapiro died aged 93 at his New York City apartment in 1996, only a few months after his brother Meyer.

References

1903 births
1996 deaths
Columbia School of Engineering and Applied Science alumni
Columbia College (New York) alumni
Lithuanian Jews
American people of Lithuanian-Jewish descent
Lithuanian chess players
American chess players
Jewish chess players
20th-century chess players
Emigrants from the Russian Empire to the United States